The Jackfork Sandstone, also referred to as the Jackfork Group, is a geologic formation associated with the Ouachita Fold and Thrust Belt exposed in western Arkansas and southeastern Oklahoma. It is named for Jackfork Mountain in Pittsburg and Pushmataha counties, Oklahoma.

The Jackfork Sandstone is a thin- to massive-bedded, fine- to coarse-grained, brown, tan, or gray quartzitic sandstone with subordinate brown, silty sandstone and dark gray shale. It outcrops from Pulaski County, Arkansas in the east to Atoka County, Oklahoma in the west, a distance of over 200 miles. It is highly weather-resistant, resulting in a continuous chain of prominent ridges, including Rich Mountain, the second highest natural point in the Ouachita Mountains.

Paleoflora
 Aphlebia
 A. parksii
 Archaeocalamites
 A. stanleyensis
 Bothrodendron
 Calamites
 C. inopinatus
 C. menae
 C. miseri
 Lepidodendron
 L. subclypeatum
 Lepidostrobus
 L. peniculus
 Neuropteris
 N. antecedens
 Rhabdocarpos
 R. costatulus
 Rhynchogonium
 R. choctavense
 Sigillaria
 Trigonocarpum
 T. gillhami
 T. vallisjohanni

References

Carboniferous Arkansas
Carboniferous geology of Oklahoma